The kóryos (Proto-Indo-European: "army, people under arms" or "detachment, war party") refers to the theoretical Proto-Indo-European brotherhood of warriors in which unmarried young males served for several years, as a rite of passage into manhood, before their full integration into society.

Scholars have theorized the existence of the kóryos based on later Indo-European traditions and myths that feature links between landless young males, perceived as an age-class not yet fully integrated into the community of the married men; their service in a "police-army" sent away for part of the year in the wild (where they hunted animals and raided foreign communities), then defending the host society for the rest of the year; their mystical self-identification with wolves and dogs as symbols of death, lawlessness, and warrior fury; and the idea of a liminality between invulnerability and death on one side, and youth and adulthood on the other side.

Etymology and name 
The Proto-Indo-European noun *kóryos denotes a 'people under arms' and has been translated as 'army, war-band, unit of warriors', or as 'detachment, war party'. It stems from the noun *kóro- 'cutting, section, division', attested in Old Persian as kāra 'people, army' and in Lithuanian as kãras 'war, army'.

The term *kóryos has descendant cognates in the Baltic *kāryas 'army', Celtic *koryos 'troop, tribe', and Germanic *harjaz 'host, troop, army, raiding-party'. In west-central Indo-European dialects, the designation *koryonos, meaning 'leader of the *kóryos' (here attached to the suffix -nos 'master of'), is also attested: Ancient Greek koíranos 'army-leader', Old Norse Herjan (< PGmc *harjanaz 'army-leader'), and Brittonic Coriono-totae 'people of the army-leader'.

The Gallic tribes Uo-corri ('two-armies'), Tri-corii ('three-armies') and Petru-corii ('four-armies') were presumably formed from alliances of roving war-bands. The noun *harja- is also part of compound names in Germanic languages, such as Herigast (Heregast), possibly attested as Harikast on the Negau helmet. Some toponyms in Western Europe, such as Cherbourg in France or Heerlen in the Netherlands, may stem from historical ethnic groups whose name contained the Celtic noun *koryo- 'army, troop', as proposed by Pierre-Yves Lambert.

Additionally, the Asturian personal name Vacoria (similar to Gaulish Vocorius) has been interpreted as stemming from the Celtic ethnic name  'possessing two armies', and the Gallic tribal name Coriosolites as meaning 'those who watch over the troop', or ''those who purchase soldiers or mercenaries'. Ancient paleo-Hispanic onomastics also attest the noun, albeit in the form *koro, with the same meaning.

In Indo-European studies, the modern German term  (literally 'alliance of men') is often used to refer to the *kóryos. However, it can be misleading since the war-bands were made up of adolescent males, not grown-up men. Some scholars have proposed the terms Bruderschaft ('fraternity') or Jungmannschaft ('young [group of] men') as preferable alternatives.

Historiography 

These theories influenced German Völkisch movements in the period 1900–1920s, then Nazi circles during the 1930–1940s. Scholarship from the later part of the 20th century has pointed out the far-right ideological foundations of most of the earlier works, but has also yielded new evidence supporting the existence of such brotherhoods of warriors in early Germanic and Indo-European cultures.

The standard comparative overview of the subject is Kim McCone's Hund, Wolf und Krieger bei den Indogermanen, published in 1987. Another influential study is Priscilla K. Kershaw's The One-Eyed God: Odin and the (Indo-)Germanic Männerbünde (1997).

Description

Rite of passage 

The kóryos were composed of adolescent males (presumably from 12–13 up to 18–19 years of age), usually coming from prominent families and initiated together into manhood as an age-class cohort. After undergoing painful trials to enter the group, they were sent away to live as landless warriors in the wild for a number of years, within a group ranging from two to twelve members. The young males went without possession other than their weapons, living on the edges of their host society. Social behaviour normally forbidden, such as stealing, raiding, or sexually assaulting women, were therefore tolerated amongst kóryos members, as long as the malevolent acts were not directed at the host society. Their activities were seasonal, and they lived with their home community for a part of the year.Their life was centred on military duties, hunting wild animals and pillaging settlements on one side; and on the recitation of heroic poetry telling the deeds of past heroes and cattle theft legends on the other side. A tradition of epic poetry celebrating heroic and violent warriors conquering loot and territories (which were portrayed as possessions the gods wanted them to have) probably participated in the validation of violence among the kóryos. The leader of the band, the *koryonos, was determined with a game of dice, and the result accepted as the gods' choice. The other members pledged to die for him, and to kill for him. He was regarded as their master in the rite of passage, but also as their 'employer' since the young warriors served as his bodyguards and protectors.

The period of initiation within the kóryos was perceived as a transitional stage preceding the status of adult warrior and was usually crowned by marriage. The kóryos were symbolically associated with death and liminality, but also with fecundity and sexual license. Kim McCone has argued that members of the *kóryos initially served as young unmarried males without possessions before their eventual incorporation into the *tewtéh2- ('the tribe, people under arms'), composed of the property-owning and married adult males.

According to David W. Anthony and Dorcas R. Brown, the kóryos may have served "as an organization promoting group cohesion and effectiveness in combat, as an instrument of external territorial expansion, and as a regulatory device in chiefly feast-centred economies."

In Europe, those oath-bound initiatory war-bands were eventually absorbed by increasingly powerful patrons and kings during the Iron Age, while they were downgraded in ancient India with the rise of the Brahmin caste, leading to their progressive demise.

Role in the Indo-European migrations 

Scholars have argued that the institution of the kóryos played a key role during the Indo-European migrations and the diffusion of Indo-European languages across most of western Eurasia. Raids headed by those young warriors could have led to the establishment of new settlements on foreign lands, preparing the ground for the larger migration of whole tribes including old men, women and children. This scenario is supported by archaeological data from the early Single Grave–Corded Ware Culture in Jutland, where 90 per cent of all burials belonged to males in what appears to be a 'colonial' expansion on the territory of the Funnelbeaker culture.

The kóryos probably drove people not protected by the Indo-European social umbrella to move under it in order to obtain safety or restitution from thieving and raiding. They could therefore have served as an incentive for the recruitment of outsiders into social positions that offered vertical mobility, horizontal reciprocity, and the possibility of immortality through praise poetry, made more attractive by generosity at patron-sponsored public feasts.

Attributes

Wolf-like behaviour 
The war-bands consisted of shape-shifting warriors wearing animal skins to assume the nature of wolves or dogs. Members of the kóryos adopted wolfish behaviours and bore names containing the word 'wolf' or 'dog', each a symbol of death and the Otherworld in Indo-European belief. The idealized attributes of the kóryos were indeed borrowed from the imagery surrounding the wolf: violence, trickery, swiftness, great strength, and warrior fury. By identifying with the wild animals, kóryos members perceived themselves as physically and legally moved outside the human world, and therefore no longer restrained by human taboos. When returning to their normal life, they would feel no remorse for breaking the rules of their home society because they had not been humans or at least not living in the cultural space of the host society when those rules were broken.

In Ancient Greece, the wolfish ways of fighting were reserved to the adolescent groups passing the warrior initiation. Young members of the Athenian ephebos and the Spartan crypteia were able to use war techniques usually forbidden to the adult warrior: they covered their actions and prowled at night, using tricks and ambushes. The ephebos in particular were under the patronage of the god Apollo, associated in many myths with wolves and bearing the epithet Lykeios. During his initiation, the Irish mythical hero Sétanta, a typical depiction of the kóryos member, is given the name Cú Chulainn ('hound of Culann'). The young members of the Ossetic balc were strongly associated with the wolf and described as a k'war ('herd'). The Avestan literature also mentions the mairyō ('wolf, dog') as the young male serving in warrior-bands.In the Norse tradition, berserkers were sometimes called úlfheðnar ('wolf-skinned'), and the frenzy warriors wearing the skins of wolves were designated as úlfheðinn ('wolf-coat'). The folk legend of the werewolf ('man-wolf'), found in many European traditions, is probably reminiscent of the wolfish behaviour of the warrior-bands. Similar word-formations can be found in Western Indo-European languages, such as Ancient Greek luk-ánthrōpos ('wolf-man'), Proto-Germanic *wira-wulfaz ('man-wolf'; cf. werewolf), Proto-Celtic *wiro-kū ('man-dog'), and Proto-Slavic *vьlko-dlakь ('wolf-haired one'), at the origin of lycanthopy, werewolf, Viroconium, and Wurdulac, respectively.

Warrior-fury 

The conflicting opposition between death and invulnerability is suggested by the attributes generally associated with the kóryos: great strength, resistance to pain, and lack of fear. The typical state of warrior fury or frenzy was supposed to increase his strength above natural expectations, with ecstatic performances accentuated by dances and perhaps by the use of drugs. The Indo-European term for a 'mad attack' (*eis) is common to the Vedic, Germanic, and Iranian traditions. The Germanic berserkers were depicted as practitioners of the battle fury ('going berserk', berserksgangr), while the martial fury of the Ancient Greek warrior was called lyssa, a derivation of lykos ('wolf'), as if the soldiers temporarily become wolves in their mad rage.

As such, young males were perceived as dangers even to their host society. The Maruts, a group of storm deities of the Vedic tradition were depicted as both beneficial and dangerous entities. The Irish hero Cúchulainn becomes a terrorizing figure among the inhabitants of the capital-city, Emain Macha, after he beheaded three rivals from his own people (the Ulaid). Aiming to appease his fury, they decide to capture him and plunge his body into basins of water in order to 'cool him down'. Irish sources also describe some of the warrior-bands as savages (díberg), living like wolves by pillaging and massacring. Similarly, some Greek warrior-bands were called hybristḗs (ὑβριστή) and portrayed as violent and insolent groups of ransomers and looters.

Nudity 

Many kurgan stelae found in the Pontic–Caspian steppe, which are associated with the Proto-Indo-European culture, depict a naked male warrior carved on the stone with little else than a belt and his weapons. In later Indo-European traditions, kóryos raiders likewise wore a belt that bound them to their leader and the gods, and little else.

In Ancient Greek and Roman literary sources, Germanic and Celtic peoples were often portrayed as fighting naked or semi naked, armed only with light weapons. At the battle of Telamon (225 BC), Gallic warriors reportedly wore only trousers and capes. In the Norse tradition, Berserker usually scorned the use of armour to favour animal skins, and they were sometimes also said to fight naked. Ancient Italic tribes also had in their ranks berserk-like warriors who fought naked, barefoot, flowing-haired, and often in single combat. Similarly, young Vedic boys wore only a belt and an animal skin during their initiation within the kóryos.

Celtiberian statuettes from the 5th–3rd centuries BC depict naked warriors with a sword, a small round shield (caetra), a "power belt", and sometimes a helmet. The tradition of kurgan stelae featuring warriors with a belt is also common in the Scythian cultures. According to military historian Michael P. Speidel, the scene 36 of Trajan's Column, which shows bare-chested, bare-footed young men wearing only a shield, could be a depiction of Germanic Berserkers.

Darkness
The kóryos is usually associated with the colour black, or at least dark, and with the mobilization of chthonic forces. Frequent references are made to the "black earth" or the "dark night" in the Indo-European literature, and hunting and fighting at night appears to have been one of the distinguishing characteristics of the kóryos.

In the Vedic tradition, the followers of Indra and Rudra wore black clothes, and the young heroes of Medieval Armenia were called "black youths". The "black" Aram is the idealized figure of the kóryos leader in Armenian myths, and his armies are said to suddenly attack adversaries "before dawn" in the borderlands of Armenia.

The Athenian ephebes traditionally wore a black chlamys, and the Ancient Greek tradition featured an initiation ritual imposed upon young males in which "black hunters" were sent out to the frontier to perform military exploits. Indeed, the Greek model of the black hunter, Meleager, is named after the word for "black" (melas), and the Armenian name Aram stems from the root *rē-mo- ('dirt, soot').

The Roman historian Tacitus (1st c. AD) also mentions the Germanic Harii (whose name could derive from *kóryos) as "savages" wearing black shields, dyeing their bodies, and choosing dark nights for battle. Kershaw has proposed that the Harii were the kóryos of the neighbouring Lugii tribe.

Attestations

Krasnosamarskoe 
At Krasnosamarskoe (Volga steppes) were found 51 dogs and 7 wolves sacrificed and consumed in what could have been a winter-season rite of passage into a status represented metaphorically by the animals. The site is associated with the Srubnaya culture (1900–1700 BC), generally regarded as proto-Iranian, and possibly made up of archaic Iranian speakers.

Krasnosamarskoe appears to have been a place where people from around the region came to periodically engage in transgressive initiation rituals conducted in the winter and requiring dog and wolf sacrifice. According to Anthony and Brown, "it was a place of inversion, as is the eating of wolves, animal symbolic of anti-culture (a murderer 'has become like a wolf' in Hittite law; 'wolf' was used to refer to brigands and outlaws, people who stand outside the law, in many other Indo-European languages)." The dogs found on the site seem to have been well-treated during their lifetime, and they were probably familiar pets.

The ritual was centred on dog sacrifice in a region and time period when dogs were not normally eaten. Cattle and sheep were indeed consumed throughout the year on the site, whereas dogs were killed almost exclusively in the winter in a regular inversion of normal dietary customs.

Indian tradition 
In the Vedic tradition, young boys began the initiation at 8 years old, studying heroic poetry about past ancestors and practicing their hunting and fighting skills. At 16, they were initiated into a warrior band during the winter solstice ritual (the Ekāstakā), during which the boys went into an ecstatic state then ritually died to be reborn as dogs of war. After their leader was determined by a dice game, the initiated youths were cast away in the wild for four years to live as dogs, stealing animals, women, goods and territory until the summer solstice ended the raiding season. The young warriors then returned to their forest residence where they held a Vrātyastoma sacrifice to thank the gods for their success. At the end the four-year initiation, a final Vrātyastoma sacrifice was performed to transform the dog-warrior into a responsible adult man, then the newly-initiated males destroyed their old clothes to become human once again, ready to return to their family and to live by the rules of their host community.

The Vrātyas ('dog-priests') were known for performing the Ekāstakā ceremony at the winter solstice, when Indra, the god of war, is said to have been born with his band of Maruts. The term Vrāta is used in particular the Rigveda to describe the Maruts.

Iranian tradition 

The Scythians probably led military expeditions as a mandatory initiation into manhood which lasted for several years, as suggested by historical raids in Anatolia.

In the Ossetic tradition, a compulsory initiation into manhood involved a military expedition known as the balc and lasting for one year. Groups were formed during a spring feast (Styr Tūtyr), dedicated to Wastyrgi, the deity of wolves and warriors, in Varkazana (the "month of men-wolves"; October–November).

According to scholar Touraj Daryaee, figures from the Iranian folkore such as Hosein the Kord (or Gord) exhibit archetype Männerbund traits.

Greek tradition 

In Ancient Greece, the traditional war-bands lost some of the frenzy attributes that characterize shape shifters in other Indo-European cultures, but they still maintained the terror-inspiring appearance and the tricky war tactics of the original *kóryos.

From 17 to 20 years old, the Athenian ephebos had to live during the 2 years in the ephebeia (ἐφηβεία). Relegated to the edges of society, they were given a marginal status without a full citizenship. Their duty was to guard the limit of their community during peaceful times, generally as guards of fields, forests, and orchards. Leading ambushes and skirmishes in war time, the ephebos wore black tunics and were lightly armed. An essential part of their training was the traditional hunt, conducted at night with the use of snares and traps. In the case of the Spartan krypteia, it was even a human hunt.

Similar formations, the Irenas (ἰρένας), were in charge of overseeing Helots and assisting the krypteia. The Greek colony of Taras is said to have been founded by a group of 20-year-old Spartan Partheniae who were refused citizenship in order to encourage them to leave their hometown and found a new settlement. Herodotus mentions the myth of Aristodemus, who fought courageously but was refused the recognition as best fighter by the Spartans because he got "mad" (lyssônta) and abandoned the formation, suggesting that Ancient Greeks thought that berserk-acting warriors had no place in the phalanx formation.

Germanic tradition 

During the first centuries of the Common Era, the Celto-Germanic tribal societies of Gallia Belgica and Germania Inferior probably included formations of young men which represented a significant political force within their host communities because of their military nature. Among the Batavi, the Romano-Germanic god Hercules Magusanus was likely regarded as the patron and protector of the Batavorum iuventus, a sort of paramilitary organization preparing young men for the soldier's life.

Vikings were made up of groups of young people led by an adult male during a three-year campaign overseas. The social group consisting of the grown-up men (the "former youths') only joined the formation when the time had come to settle in the conquered lands. Indeed, during the Viking Age, the raids lasted for two centuries before a definite colonization occurred in regions like modern-day Britain, France or Russia.

In the 13th-century Icelandic Volsunga Saga, Sigmund trains his nephew Sinfjotli to harden him for later conflicts by sneaking with him through the forest dressed in wolf skins, thieving and killing. In a scene that can be compared to the Vedic tradition and the archeological site of Krasnosamarskoe, they removed their wolf skins and burned them at the end of the initiation, since they were ready to return to the host community and follow a life constrained by its social taboos.

Italic tradition 

The Italic ver sacrum involved the departure of an entire age group in order to found a "colony". In particular, the story of the Mamertines and the Roman ver sacrum dedicated in 217 AD by the decimviri sacris faciundis explicitly state that participating members were young people.

Celtic tradition 
In the Fenian Cycle of Irish mythology, the fianna are depicted as bands of young male warriors and guards, led by the mythical hunter-warrior Finn. They had to live outdoors in the woods and hills of Ireland during the warmer months from May (Beltane) until October (Samhain), feeding themselves only by hunting. During the colder months from November to April, the fianna went back to their family farms.

The early Irish diberga or fēindidi were bands of young unmarried men who lived off the country raiding and hunting; their behaviour was explicitly that of a wolf or dog.

The Gaesatae, a group Gallic mercenary warriors said to fight naked and mentioned in the late 3rd century BC, may also be related.

Armenian tradition 
The  ('young warriors') are mentioned in the story of the legendary founder of Armenia, Hayk. His descendant, Aram, interpreted as the "second image of Hayk", heads an army of 50,000  ('youths') warriors extending the borders of the territory on every side to create a new, superior Armenia. Contrary to Hayk, who is fighting his adversary within the territory of Armenia, Aram makes war in the borderlands and beyond the borders of Armenia. According to Armen Petrosyan, this suggests that the young warriors of Aram can be interpreted as a reflex of the kóryos, while Hayk's soldiers may be the depiction of the adult men in arms.

See also 
 Berserkr, Werewolf
 Indo-European migrations
 Proto-Indo-European society
 Rite of passage
 Ver Sacrum, Ephebos, Krypteia, Fianna, Maruts

References 
Footnotes

Citations

Bibliography

Further reading

 Daryaee, Touraj. "Männerbund Aspects of Old Persian Anušiya-." In: Achemenet. Vingt Ans Apres: Etudes Offertes a Pierre Briant a L'occasion Des Vingt Ans Du Programme Achemenet. Edited by Agut-Labordère Damien, Boucharlat Rémy, Joannès Francis, Kuhrt Amélie, and Stolper Matthew W. LEUVEN; PARIS; BRISTOL, CT: Peeters Publishers, 2021. pp. 73–78. Accessed July 2, 2021. doi:10.2307/j.ctv1q26jhj.9.

 
 
 

 "Youthbands, Migrants, and Wolves". In: Vuković, Krešimir. Wolves of Rome: The Lupercalia from Roman and Comparative Perspectives. Berlin, Boston: De Gruyter Oldenbourg, 2023. pp. 146-172. https://doi.org/10.1515/9783110690118-010
 

Proto-Indo-Europeans
Anthropology of religion
Rites of passage
Military units and formations of antiquity